Mulheres de areia ("Sand Women") is a Brazilian telenovela produced by the TV Globo and aired between 1 February 1993 and 24 September 1993, in 203 episodes. It was written by Ivani Ribeiro with the contribution of Solange Castro Neves and directed by Wolf Maya, Ignácio Coqueiro, Andre Schultz and Carlos Magalhães. It is a remake of the soap opera of the same name that aired on the now-defunct Rede Tupi from 1973 to 1974, when Eva Wilma portrayed the two main characters of the plot (the twins Ruth and Raquel).

Plot 
Young Marcos Assunção goes to the fictional city of Pontal D' Areia to assist in the businesses of the Assunção family. The young man meets Ruth, daughter of a poor fisherman, and falls in love with her, but he ends up involved with Raquel, the twin sister of Ruth. The sisters are identical, but of opposite personalities. While Ruth truly loves the young man, Raquel desires his position and riches. She also has a lover, Wanderley, an outlaw.

Tonho da Lua, best friend of Ruth, is mentally disturbed and famous for creating sculptures of women with the sand of the beach. Raquel must also face Virgílio Assunção, Marcos's father, who doesn't accept her relationship with his son. Virgílo, an unscrupulous man, is the vice-mayor and owner of the biggest hotel in the city. His goal is to turn Pontal D' Areia into a tourist center, but he must deal with the mayor of the city, the Green politician Breno. The population of the city is divided. Breno has one ally, Tônia, a local trader. To demoralize Breno, Virgílio puts scarecrows in the beaches, symbolizing the mayor who scares the tourists.

Meanwhile, Ruth suffers in silence over the marriage of Raquel, knowing that Marcos is only interested in Raquel. The plot has a twist when Raquel is believed dead and Ruth assumes her personality to be with the man she loves. But Raquel did not die and she returns to claim her own life.

Cast
Glória Pires - Ruth Araújo/Raquel Araújo Assunção
Guilherme Fontes - Marcos Assunção
Marcos Frota - Tonho da Lua
Raul Cortez - Virgílio Assunção
Suzana Vieira - Clara "Clarita" Assunção
Laura Cardoso - Isaura Araújo
Sebastião Vasconcelos - Floriano Araújo
Vivianne Pasmanter - Maria Lúcia "Malu" Assunção
Humberto Martins - Almeida Passos "Alaôr"
Thaís de Campos - Arlete Assunção
Adriano Reys - Oswaldo Sampaio
Nicette Bruno - Julieta Sampaio (Juju)
Andréa Beltrão - Tônia
Carlos Zara - Zé Pedro
Eloísa Mafalda - Manuela
Alexandra Marzo - Carola Sampaio
Irving São Paulo - Zé Luís
Karina Perez - Andréa Sampaio
Daniel Dantas - Breno Soares de Azevedo
Isadora Ribeiro - Vera Soares de Azevedo
Henri Pagnoncelli - Dr. César
Jonas Bloch - Alemão
Paulo Goulart - Donato; Villain
Gabriela Alves - Glorinha
Eduardo Moscovis - Tito
Suely Franco - Celina de Almeida Passos
Oscar Magrini - Vitor
Fabrício Bittar - Reginho
Paulo Betti - Wanderley Amaral
Edwin Luisi - Dr. Munhoz
Ricardo Blat - Marujo
Evandro Mesquita - Joel
João Carlos Barroso - Daniel
Alexia Deschamps - Maria Helena
Serafim Gonzalez - Garnizé
Stepan Nercessian - Delegado Rodrigo
Antônio Pompêo - Servílio
Denise Milfont - Vilma
Joel Barcellos - Chico Belo
Lu Mendonça - Do Carmo
Cibele Larrama - Luzia
Marco Miranda - Duarte
Marcelo Mansfield - Santiago
Cleyde Blota - Hilda
Kleber Drable - Padre João
Leonardo Miranda - Jota
Luciano Vianna - Tavinho
Roney Villela - Carijó
Toi Bressane - Rozendo

Soundtrack

International Album 1993
 Easy (Faith No More)
 Sweat (A La La La La Long) (Inner Circle)
 Bed of Roses (Bon Jovi)
 See the Light (Snap!)
 Let It Me Be (Ouriel)
 Close Encounters (Clouseau)
 Forever in Love (Kenny G)
 Bad Bad Boys (Midi, Maxi & Efti)
 Wild Thing (Tone Loc)
 Simple Life (Elton John)
 Looking at My Girl (Double You)
 No Ordinary Love (Sade)
 Latin Motion (Frank Shadon)
 Groovin' in the Midnight (Maxi Priest)
 The Colour of the Risk (Franco Perini)

National Album
 Ai ai ai ai ai (Ivan Lins)
 Pensando em minha amada (Chitãozinho & Xororó)
 Sexy Iemanjá (Pepeu Gomes) - Opening theme
 Encontro das águas (Maurício Mattar)
 Caminhos cruzados (Gal Costa)
 Ovelha negra (Os Fantasmas)
 Paraíso (Mariana Leporace)
 Down (T Set Squad)
 Toque de emoção (Joanna)
 A vida é festa (Banda Beijo)
 Desafios (Simone)
 Figura (Orlando Morais)
 Fantasia real (Biafra)
 Gita (Raul Seixas)
 Dirty game (Easy Rider)
 Voyager (Franco Perini)

Awards
APCA (1993): Best Actress - Glória Pires
Troféu Imprensa (1993): Best Actress - Glória Pires

Remake 
 In 2014, TV Azteca announce the remake, under the name of Mujeres de arena, starring Gabriela Spanic.

External links
  Official page
 

1993 telenovelas
1993 Brazilian television series debuts
1993 Brazilian television series endings
Brazilian telenovelas
TV Globo telenovelas
Television series about twins
Portuguese-language telenovelas